Upendra Mahato is a Nepalese politician. He is a member of Provincial Assembly of Madhesh Province from Loktantrik Samajwadi Party, Nepal. Mahato, a resident of Chandranagar Rural Municipality, was elected via 2017 Nepalese provincial elections from Sarlahi 1(A).

Electoral history

2017 Nepalese provincial elections

References

Living people
1978 births
Madhesi people
21st-century Nepalese politicians
Members of the Provincial Assembly of Madhesh Province
Loktantrik Samajwadi Party, Nepal politicians